Fremontodendron mexicanum is a rare species of shrub in the mallow family known by the common names Mexican flannelbush, Mexican fremontia, and Southern flannelbush, that is endemic to the central Peninsular Ranges in Mexico and the United States.

Distribution
The species is known from about ten occurrences in northern Baja California state and adjacent southern San Diego County, California. However, it has most recently been confirmed to exist in only two of those locales currently. In 1993, fewer than 100 individuals were thought to exist. In the United States it is a federally listed endangered species.

Ecology
The shrub grows generally on alluvial plains, in California montane chaparral and woodlands and temperate coniferous forest habitats, among Tecate cypress (Cupressus forbesii) trees.

Description

The leathery and furry olive green leaves are up to 5 centimeters long and divided into several wide lobes.

The solitary flowers, each about 6 centimeters wide, appear spread along the branches. The showy flowers are made up of five bright orange sepals and have no true petals.

Cultivation
Fremontodendron mexicanum is cultivated as an ornamental plant by specialty plant nurseries,  for planting in native plant, drought tolerant, and wildlife gardens, and in natural landscaping and habitat restoration projects.

Cultivated plants need good drainage, and no supplemental summer water when established.

Hybrids
There are several named hybrids of Fremontodendron mexicanum and Fremontodendron californicum in the horticultural trade, they include:
It is the winner of the Award of Garden Merit from the California Horticultural Society in 1965, and received a First Class Certificate from the Royal Horticultural Society in 1967. 
A hybrid between Fremontodendron decumbens and Fremontodendron mexicanum.

References

External links
CalFlora Database: Fremontodendron mexicanum (Mexican flannelbush, Southern flannelbush, Mexican fremontia)
Jepson Manual Treatment of Fremontodendron mexicanum
USDA Plants Profile for Fremontodendron mexicanum (Mexican flannelbush)
The Nature Conservancy
Fremontodendron mexicanum — UC Photos gallery

Bombacoideae
Flora of Baja California
Flora of California
Natural history of the California chaparral and woodlands
Natural history of the Peninsular Ranges
Natural history of San Diego County, California
Garden plants of North America
Drought-tolerant plants
Shrubs